Hydnotrya is a genus of ascomycete fungi related to the false morels of the genus Gyromitra. There are about 15 species in the genus. A molecular phylogenetic study recovered a species that was described but neglected for 50 years, Hydnotrya bailii.

Species
Hydnotrya bailii
Hydnotrya cerebriformis
Hydnotrya confusa
Hydnotrya cubispora
Hydnotrya inordinata
Hydnotrya michaelis
Hydnotrya soehneri
Hydnotrya subnix
Hydnotrya tulasnei
Hydnotrya variiformis

References

External links

Discinaceae
Pezizales genera
Taxa named by Christopher Edmund Broome
Taxa named by Miles Joseph Berkeley
Taxa described in 1846